The 2001 European Ladies' Team Championship took place in 10–14 July at Campo de Golf de Meis in the province of Pontevedra, . It was the 22nd women's golf amateur European Ladies' Team Championship.

Venue 
The hosting public course, in the municipality Meis, 60 kilometres north-east of the city of Pontevedra, Galicia, Spain, opened its 18 holes in 2000. It is situated on the Monte Castrove, a hilly high plateau, in a light stone pine forest, with widespread fairways framed by stone pines and with six lakes around the course.

Due to heavy fog on the course, play was cancelled the scheduled last two days of the tournament.

Format 
All participating teams played two qualification rounds of stroke-play with six players, counted the five best scores for each team.

The eight best teams formed flight A, intended to play knock-out match-play over the next three days. The teams were seeded based on their positions after the stroke-play. The first placed team was drawn to play the quarter final against the eight placed team, the second against the seventh, the third against the sixth and the fourth against the fifth. In each match between two nation teams, two 18-hole foursome games and five 18-hole single games were played. Teams were allowed to switch players during the team matches, selecting other players in to the afternoon single games after the morning foursome games. Games all square after 18 holes were declared halved, if the team match was already decided.

The eight teams placed 9–16 in the qualification stroke-play formed flight B, to play similar knock-out match-play, with one foursome game and four single games, to decide their final positions.

The two teams placed 17–18 in the qualification stroke-play formed flight C, to meet each other, with one foursome game and four single games, to decide their final positions.

Due to the weather conditions, heavy fog over the golf course, on the days of the intended semi finals and final, the final order of the teams were decided based on the quarter finals and the qualification stroke-play competition.

Teams 
18 nation teams contested the event. Greece took part for the first time. Each team consisted of six players.

Players in the leading teams

Other participating teams

Winners 
Team Sweden lead  the opening 36-hole qualifying competition, with a score of 30 over par 750, one stroke ahead of host nation team Spain.

Individual leader in the 36-hole stroke-play competition was Rebecca Hudson, England with a score of 2 over par 146, one stroke ahead of Vikki Laing, Scotland.

Due to unplayable conditions the last two days of the tournament, the four semi finalist teams were ranked based on their qualifying round standings, why team Sweden was declared champions, earning their fourth title and also their fourth title in the last eleven championships. Spain earned the silver and Scotland the bronze. The other teams were ranked in a similar way.

Results 
Qualification round

Team standings

* Note: In the event of a tie the order was determined by the better total non-counting scores.

Individual leaders

 Note: There was no official award for the lowest individual score.

Flight A

Bracket

* Note: Semi finals, final and bronze match cancelled due to unplayable weather conditions.

Final standings

Sources:

See also 
 Espirito Santo Trophy – biennial world amateur team golf championship for women organized by the International Golf Federation.
 European Amateur Team Championship – European amateur team golf championship for men organised by the European Golf Association.

References

External links 
 European Golf Association: Results

European Ladies' Team Championship
Golf tournaments in Spain
European Ladies' Team Championship
European Ladies' Team Championship
European Ladies' Team Championship